The Charco Azul Group is a geologic group in southeastern Costa Rica and western Panama. The group comprises the Armuelles, Penita and Charco Azul Formations and preserves fossils.

See also 

 List of fossiliferous stratigraphic units in Costa Rica
 List of fossiliferous stratigraphic units in Panama

References 

Geologic groups of North America
Geologic formations of Costa Rica
Geologic formations of Panama
Shale formations
Conglomerate formations
Siltstone formations
Sandstone formations
Shallow marine deposits
Formations
Formations